The Scientific and Technical Awards are three different Honorary Awards that are given by the Academy of Motion Picture Arts and Sciences (AMPAS) during the annual Academy Awards season. The Awards have been presented since the 4th Academy Awards in November 1931, to recognize original developments resulting in significant improvements in motion picture production and exhibition. The Awards are presented at a formal dinner ceremony a couple weeks before the principal Academy Awards ceremony.
   
   

These awards recognize significant milestones in the development of technology for motion pictures and are conferred by vote of the Academy Board of Governors.  Potential nominations for awards are investigated by a special committee within the Academy, "The Scientific and Technical Awards Committee", which presents a written report and recommendation to the Board of Governors.

Additionally, the John A. Bonner Medal of Commendation, given for "outstanding service and dedication in upholding the high standards of the Academy", and the Gordon E. Sawyer Award, both also considered Honorary Awards, are usually also chosen by the Scientific and Technical Awards Committee and conferred at this annual presentation dinner ceremony.

Three kinds of Scientific and Technical Awards

Innovations in motion pictures technology are recognized with the following awards:
 Academy Award of Merit – an Academy statuette (an Oscar);
 Scientific and Engineering Award – an Academy bronze tablet; and
 Technical Achievement Award – an Academy certificate.

Award of Merit
From the 4th Academy Awards in 1931 through the 50th Academy Awards in 1978 the award was originally called the "Class I Scientific and Technical Award." The award is non-competitive. Winners receive an Oscar statuette. , 50 achievements have been recognized with an Award of Merit.

Scientific and Engineering Award

The Scientific and Engineering Award is given for scientific achievements that produce a definite influence on the advancement of the motion picture industry. Achievements need not have been developed and introduced during the award year.

Technical Achievement Award

See also

 List of engineering awards

References

External links
"Scientific and Technical Awards" – Index for these Awards on the official Web site of the Academy Awards (oscars.org).
Official Academy Award Database –  Searchable.
"Academy Award of Merit", "Scientific and Engineering Award" and "Technical Achievement Award" – Description of these Academy Awards

Scientific or Technical
Academy S